Klitten is a village and a former municipality in the district Görlitz, Saxony, Germany. Since 1 February 2009, it is part of the municipality Boxberg.

External links 
 

Former municipalities in Saxony
Boxberg, Saxony